XHOE-FM is a Spanish & English Top 40 (CHR) radio station that serves the state of Querétaro branded as Exa FM.

History
XHOE hit the air on June 1, 1980, the first commercial FM station in the state of Querétaro. It was known as Estéreo Mundo, a name still reflected in the concessionaire of this station, and owned by the Desarrollo Radiofónico group. In 1993, Desarrollo changed its name to Multimundo, and in the mid-90s, XHOE changed its name to Planeta.

In 2006, all of Multimundo's remaining stations, located in Querétaro, San Miguel de Allende and Torreón, were sold to Grupo Imagen, except for XHOE.

References

External links
Official website
Multimundo Website
Exa 95.5 FM

Radio stations in Querétaro